Haliris pygmaea is a species of saltwater clams in the family Verticordiidae.

Distribution 
This species is recorded in the Philippines.

References

Anomalodesmata
Molluscs described in 1952